Happy Place may refer to:

 Happy Place (film), 2020
 "Happy Place", a 2017 single by Alison Wonderland
 ""Happy Place" (Terror Jr song), 2019
 Happy Place, a 2020 EP by Juls
 Happy Place, a 2019 play by Adam Cayton-Holland
 Happy Place, a podcast by Fearne Cotton

See also 
 "The Happy Place", an episode of CSI: Crime Scene Investigation
 "A Happy Place", a 2010 single by Katie Melua
 A Happy Place, a film production company co-founded by Lance Bass
 My Happy Place, a 2019 album by Emma Bunton